The A846 road is one of the two principal roads of Islay in the Inner Hebrides off the west coast of mainland Scotland and the only 'A' road on the neighbouring island of Jura.

A ferry connects the two islands across the Sound of Islay.

The road goes further north than Lussagiven but as a manor road through Ardlussa and Lealt and then as a track to Kinuachdrachd. The road also goes further than Ardbeg, going through Kintour and as a track to Ardtalla.

Settlements on or near the A846
North to South
Lussagiven
Lagg
Leargybreck
Craighouse
Cabrach
Feolin Ferry
Ferry between Jura and Islay
Port Askaig
Keills
Ballygrant
Bridgend (junction with the A847)
Bowmore
Glenegedale
Port Ellen
Laphroaig
Lagavulin
Ardbeg

References

Inner Hebrides
Roads in Scotland
Jura, Scotland
Islay